Alkalimonas is a genus in the phylum Pseudomonadota (Bacteria).

Etymology
The name Alkalimonas derives from:
 New Latin noun alkali (from Arabic al-qaliy), ashes of salt wort; Greek feminine gender noun monas (μονάς), nominally meaning "a unit", but in effect meaning a bacterium; New Latin feminine gender noun Alkalimonas, alkaline monad.

Members of the genus Alkalimonas can be referred to as alkalimonads (viz. Trivialisation of names).

Species
The genus contains 3 species (including basonyms and synonyms), namely
 A. amylolytica ( Ma et al. 2007,  (Type species of the genus).;: Greek noun amulon, starch; New Latin adjective lyticus -a -um (from Greek adjective lutikos (λυτικός) -ē -on), able to loose, able to dissolve; New Latin feminine gender adjective amylolytica, starch dissolving.)
 A. collagenimarina ( Kurata et al. 2007, ; New Latin noun collagenum, collagen; Latin adjective marinus -a -um, of the sea, marine; New Latin feminine gender adjective collagenimarina, collagenolytic bacterium isolated from the sea.)
 A. delamerensis ( Ma et al. 2007, ;: New Latin feminine gender adjective delamerensis, pertaining to Delamere estates, which include Lake Elmenteita (the source of the type strain), Kenya.)

See also
 Bacterial taxonomy
 Microbiology

References 

Bacteria genera
Gammaproteobacteria